A Force to be Reckoned With may refer to:
A Force to be Reckoned With (book), 2011 book about the Women's Institute, by Jane Robinson 
A Force to be Reckoned With (play), 2023 play about women in the police force, by Amanda whittington for Mikron Theatre Company